Torrey Pines State Beach is a public beach located in the San Diego, California community of Torrey Pines, south of Del Mar and north of La Jolla. Coastal erosion from the adjacent Torrey Pines State Reserve makes for a picturesque landscape. It is a local favorite among surfers and remains a quintessential Southern California beach. Occurrences of bioluminescence in the waters near the beach have been noted.

The beach is at the base of a series of 300-foot sandstone cliffs of white and golden stone, with a greenish layer sometimes visible at the very bottom. At the north end of the beach the cliffs end and Los Peñasquitos Lagoon, a salt marsh estuary, empties into the ocean. A county highway crosses the entrance, with limited free parking along the beach.

Ecology

The beach area supports a number of avifaunal (bird) species in addition to the marine biota. Soledad Valley, which includes the notable coastal marsh, Los Peñasquitos Lagoon, is cut by a coastal stream which discharges into the Pacific Ocean at Torrey Pines State Beach. The endangered nominal subspecies of Torrey Pine, Pinus torreyana torreyana, is found only on the small coastal strips north and south of Torrey Pines State Beach.

Surf
Waves ranging from the low 3-footers to the high 6-8 footers can be found on the north side of Torrey Pines State Beach. The Northern side of the beach has a Surfer/Surfing side while the Southern side hosts swimming, body boarding, etc.  There  is a red/yellow flag on the north part of the beach showing the boundary between the surfing side and body boarding side.  A good rule of thumb is to occasionally check where the flag is as it moves from time to time during the day.

The beach is usually not very crowded in the early hours of the day, when primarily surfers and body boarders are present.  During that time, the boundary of the surfing and body boarding areas is not as strictly enforced, as long as common courtesy is being used on both sides. The most popular part of the beach is the swimming area.

See also
 List of beaches in San Diego County
 List of California state parks
List of California State Beaches

References

External links
Official Torrey Pines State Beach website
Torrey Pines State Reserve website

Beaches of Southern California
California State Beaches
Parks in San Diego County, California
Surfing locations in California
Geography of San Diego
Places with bioluminescence
Beaches of San Diego County, California